First Lady of Missouri is the honorary title attributed to the wife of the governor of Missouri. To date there have been no female governors of Missouri, and all the governors' spouses have been women.  The first governor of Missouri was elected and took office in 1820, the year before Missouri was admitted to the Union as the 24th state.

List of first ladies of Missouri

Notes

External links
Missouri: Past Governor Bios, National Governors Association
First Ladies Gallery, Friends of the Missouri Governor's Mansion

 
Lists of people from Missouri
Lists of spouses